David Paul Baker (born 5 January 1963 in Newcastle upon Tyne, England) is an English former professional footballer.

Playing career

A centre-forward, Baker was a member of the famous Wallsend Boys Club as a youngster, and was subsequently spotted playing for Bishop Auckland, turning professional with Southampton in June 1984 at a cost of £4,000 to the south coast side. He failed to break into the first-team at Southampton, moving on a free transfer to Carlisle United on 2 July 1985. On 31 July 1987, after 71 league appearances (11 goals) for Carlisle, Baker moved to Hartlepool United, again on a free transfer, where he played 197 games (scoring 67 goals) and was a vital part of the squad that achieved promotion in 1990–91, forming a partnership with Joe Allon.

Baker moved north of the border to join Motherwell in August 1992 for £77,500. After only 9 games at Motherwell, he moved on to Gillingham on 7 January 1993 for a fee of £40,000. During his time at Priestfield he scored one of the goals in a 2–0 win over Halifax Town which secured the club's League status on the last day of the season. An overall tally of 16 goals in 62 games for the Kent side prompted York City to take him back north, this time for a fee of £15,000 in October 1994. Baker was on the bench for York when they beat Manchester United 3–0 at Old Trafford in the League Cup in 1995, where he was eventually brought on, lasting a mere seven minutes before being sent off for a second bookable offence. 
He was appointed player–coach in the summer of 1995. After 48 games (18 goals) for the Bootham Crescent side, he moved to Torquay United on 19 January 1996 for a fee of £25,000. Whilst he had settled in on the playing side, he wanted a move to the north of England and after almost joining Rochdale, who couldn't meet his wage demands, he moved to Scunthorpe United on 3 October 1996 for £15,000. He had made 30 league appearances, scoring 8 goals.

His stay at Scunthorpe was also a short one, and on 27 March 1997, after 21 league appearances in which he scored 9 goals, he moved back to Hartlepool United, as player-coach. Another 35 league games followed, in which he scored 9 goals. In the 1998 close season he declined an offer to become Torquay's player/manager, and once Mick Tait was sacked as Hartlepool manager in January 1999, his time at Victoria Park looked to be drawing to a close. He even went on trial at Plymouth Argyle in February 1999, playing for Argyle reserves in their 3–2 win over Swansea City at Home Park in the South West Trophy on the 16th of that month. His lack of match fitness, after 2 broken legs and a fractured ankle in the previous 2 years, seemed to be Kevin Hodges' main reason for not signing him for Argyle.

Baker returned to Hartlepool, playing for their reserve side on 17 February, one night after playing at the opposite end of the country. His desire to play first-team football was eventually rewarded when he was surprisingly recalled to Hartlepool's first-team squad for the rest of the season, often being used as a late substitute. In the close-season of 1999, Baker was released by Hartlepool and looked like dropping down to the Conference after an extended trial period with newly relegated Scarborough. However, on 27 August 1999, Baker signed for Carlisle United, making 17 league appearances (2 goals) until he was released the following summer. In July 2000, he signed for Northern League side Bedlington Terriers, later moving to Durham City in January 2001 in exchange for former England U-18 goalkeeper Adam Clementson. He left Durham in November 2001 to join Blyth Spartans.

Managerial career
In November 2002 Baker became manager of Blyth Spartans, leaving in September 2004 and has also worked at Newcastle United's academy. He was appointed manager of Northern League side Newcastle Benfield in September 2005 and guided them to the final qualifying round of the FA Cup for the first time in their history in the 2006–07 season. He resigned in December 2007.

In March 2008 he was appointed as assistant manager, under Tommy Cassidy at Newcastle Blue Star. Later that month he was appointed as Blue Star manager, but left in May 2008 to take a scouting role with Glenn Roeder's Norwich City.

References

External links

1963 births
Living people
Footballers from Newcastle upon Tyne
English footballers
Association football forwards
Wallsend Boys Club players
Bishop Auckland F.C. players
Southampton F.C. players
Carlisle United F.C. players
Hartlepool United F.C. players
Motherwell F.C. players
Gillingham F.C. players
York City F.C. players
Torquay United F.C. players
Scunthorpe United F.C. players
Bedlington Terriers F.C. players
Durham City A.F.C. players
Blyth Spartans A.F.C. players
English Football League players
Scottish Football League players
Blyth Spartans A.F.C. managers
Hartlepool United F.C. managers
Hartlepool United F.C. non-playing staff
English football managers
York City F.C. non-playing staff